C. nitida may refer to:
 Celosia nitida, the West Indian cockscomb, a plant species
 Coelogyne nitida, an orchid species
 Cotinis nitida, a beetle species

See also 
 Nitida (disambiguation)